Reverie is the official debut recording by The Triffids, released as a 7" extended play in November 1982. Its four tracks were produced by Tim Lambert for Resonant Records.

Track listing 

 "Reverie"
 "Place in the Sun"
 "Joan of Arc"
 "This Boy"

Personnel

The Triffids
Credited to:
 David McComb - lead vocals, guitar
 Robert McComb - guitar, vocals
 Will Akers - bass, vocals
 Margaret Gillard - piano, organ, vocals
 Alsy MacDonald - drums

Additional musicians
Mark Peters - drums

References

1982 debut EPs
The Triffids EPs